Phyllonorycter fagifolia is a moth of the family Gracillariidae. It is known from the islands of Hokkaidō and Kyūshū in Japan.

The wingspan is 5.5-6.5 mm.

The larvae feed on Fagus crenata. They mine the leaves of their host plant. The mine has the form of a ptychonomous blotch mine between two veins on the underside of the leaf.

References

fagifolia
Moths of Japan

Taxa named by Tosio Kumata
Moths described in 1963
Leaf miners